Thomas Wurdack (born February 24, 1967) is a retired American soccer defender who played professionally in the American Professional Soccer League and USISL.

In 1987 and 1988, Wurdack played collegiate soccer with the University of Central Florida.  In 1989, Wurdack turned professional with the Orlando Lions in the American Soccer League.
In 1992 and 1993, he played for the second Orlando Lions in the USISL.  In 1995, Wurdack played for the Atlanta Ruckus when it went to the A-League final.  He then began the 1996 season with the Ruckus before being traded to the Rochester Rhinos.  He refused to move to Rochester and sat out the rest of the season.  In November 1996, Wurdack signed with the Orlando Sundogs, playing for them in 1997.

References

Living people
1967 births
American soccer players
American Professional Soccer League players
American Soccer League (1988–89) players
Atlanta Silverbacks players
Orlando Lions players
Orlando Lions (1992–1996) players
Orlando Sundogs players
UCF Knights men's soccer players
USISL players
Association football defenders
Soccer players from St. Louis